Stammbach is a market town and municipality in the district of Hof in Bavaria in Germany.

References

Hof (district)